Tami Jameson (born April 13, 1968) is an American former handball player. She competed in the women's tournament at the 1996 Summer Olympics. Her twin sister, Toni, also represented the American handball team at the same Olympics.

References

External links
 

1968 births
Living people
American female handball players
Olympic handball players of the United States
Handball players at the 1996 Summer Olympics
Sportspeople from Minneapolis
21st-century American women
Pan American Games gold medalists for the United States
Competitors at the 1995 Pan American Games
Medalists at the 1995 Pan American Games
Pan American Games medalists in handball